was a village located in Shimajiri District, Okinawa Prefecture, Japan.

As of 2003, the village had an estimated population of 7,936 and a density of 655.33 persons per km². The total area was 12.11 km².

On January 1, 2006, Gushikami, along with the town of Kochinda (also from Shimajiri District), was merged to create the town of Yaese.

Dissolved municipalities of Okinawa Prefecture